Andrew Alkire Trumbo (September 15, 1797 – August 21, 1871) was a United States representative from Kentucky. He was born in Bath County, Kentucky and attended the common schools. He was employed in the county clerk's office. After studying law, he was admitted to the bar and commenced practice in Owingsville, Kentucky in 1824.In 1830, Andrew was the clerk and the Commonwealth attorney for Bath County.

Trumbo was elected as a Whig to the Twenty-ninth Congress (March 4, 1845 – March 3, 1847). After leaving Congress, he was the presidential elector on the Democratic ticket in 1848. He resumed the practice of law and moved to Franklin County, Kentucky. He died in Frankfort, Kentucky in 1871, and was buried in the City Cemetery, Owingsville, Kentucky.

References

1797 births
1871 deaths
People from Bath County, Kentucky
American people of German descent
Whig Party members of the United States House of Representatives from Kentucky
Kentucky Democrats
1848 United States presidential electors
People from Owingsville, Kentucky